Josepha Gasch-Muche (born 01.06.1944) is a German glass artist. 

Her work is held in the permanent collection of the Corning Museum of Glass in the United States.

Biography 
Gasch-Muche studied painting and drawing at the Academy of Fine Arts in Trier, Germany. She initially focused on etching and drawing and became interested in glass later on. In 1998 she developed an original method of fragmenting thin display glass into even thinner splinters by breaking it with pliers; she then arranges these shards on top of and next to each other before bonding them invisibly.

She has won several awards for her glass work, including the Coburger Glas Pries and the Bombay Sapphire Prize in 2006, and the Bayerischen Staatspreis in 2008.

Now Josepha Gasch-Muche lives and work in Alfeld/Leine Germany.

Books 

 Lichtphänomene aus Glas. Distanz, Berlin 2014, ISBN 978-3-95476-079-4

References 

German glass artists
Living people
21st-century German artists
1944 births